Talk Show is the only release by Talk Show, a short lived band featuring  Stone Temple Pilots members Dean and Robert DeLeo, Eric Kretz, and new singer Dave Coutts. The album was released in 1997 to generally favorable reviews, but only peaked at #131 on the Billboard 200. Deemed a commercial failure, the band split up in early 1998 and went their separate ways.

Track listing

External links
[ Allmusic article]

References

1997 debut albums
Atlantic Records albums